is a Japanese hot tofu dish. Soft or Medium-firm silken tofu is cut into cubes, before being lightly dusted with potato starch or cornstarch and then deep fried until golden brown.

History 
 is an old and well-known dish. It was included in Japanese tofu cookbook entitled  (literally "One hundred tofu"), published in 1782, alongside other tofu dishes such as chilled tofu and simmered tofu.

Other  dishes 
While  is the best-known  dish, some other dishes may be prepared with similar techniques. These include , using eggplant.

See also

 List of tofu dishes

References

External links

Japanese cuisine
Deep fried foods
Tofu dishes
Vegetarian dishes of Japan
Soy-based foods
Japanese words and phrases